These are the official results of the Men's 5000 metres event at the 1984 Summer Olympics in Los Angeles, California.

Medalists

Abbreviations

Records
These were the standing world and Olympic records (in minutes) prior to the 1984 Summer Olympics.

Final
Unlike many other major international championships long-distance running finals, this race was run at a consistently fast pace.  The two Portuguese runners who had qualified for the final, Antonio Leitão and Ezequiel Canario, clearly tried to exhaust the strongest pre-final favourites, such as Morocco's Saïd Aouita.  Canario set the stage for this classic showdown between Aouita, Leitão and Switzerland's Markus Ryffel by taking the lead already on the first bend.  By 800 metres, the world record holder, Britain's David Moorcroft, had already dropped to the last place.  At 1,000 metres, Canario was still leading in 2:37.73.  Moorcroft was painstakingly trying to remain in the lead group, with a four- or five-metre gap between him and New Zealand's John Walker.  By 1,200 metres, when Leitão moved into the lead, Moorcroft dropped decisively from the lead group.  At 2,000 metres, Leitão led in 5:17.76.  During the third kilometre, Leitão and Canario alternated in the lead, while Ireland's Raymond Flynn and Britain's Eamonn Martin started to struggle.  Flynn dropped from the lead group before 3,000 metres, which Leitão reached, still leading the field, in 7:59.25.  Shortly after 3,000 metres, Martin and Sweden's Mats Erixon lost contact with the lead group.  Between 3,400 and 3,800 metres, also Kenya's Wilson Waigwa, Canario, the United States' Doug Padilla and Walker had to let the six-man lead group escape from them.  At 4,000 metres, Leitão kept leading the race, with his split time of 10:38.76 suggesting that the final's winner would break 13:10.  Aouita, Ryffel, Britain's Tim Hutchings, Kenya's Paul Kipkoech and another Kenyan, Charles Cheruiyot, were still following Leitão.  Before 4,200 metres, Cheruiyot dropped from Leitão's pace, and by 4,500 metres, Kipkoech and Hutchings tired out as well.  At 4,600 metres, Leitão led in 12:10.40.  On the last back straight, Aouita and Ryffel passed Leitão.  On the final bend, Aouita stretched his lead over Ryffel to five metres.  Despite slowing down somewhat near the finish line, Aouita won Ryffel by nearly two seconds.  (See for example YouTube (user:  tommytempo1);  Suuri Olympiateos / The Great Olympic Book, Helsinki, Finland, 1984.)

1 Vainio was not permitted to start in the final after he tested positive for metenolone following the 10000 meters final.

Semifinals
Top six in each heat and next three fastest advanced to the final

Qualifying heats
Top six in each heat and next six fastest advanced to the semi-finals

See also
 1982 Men's European Championships 5.000 metres (Athens)
 1983 Men's World Championships 5.000 metres (Helsinki)
 1984 Men's Friendship Games 5.000 metres (Moscow)
 1986 Men's European Championships 5.000 metres (Stuttgart)
 1987 Men's World Championships 5.000 metres (Rome)

References

External links
 Results
 Results

 
5000 metres at the Olympics
Men's events at the 1984 Summer Olympics